The African Studies Association of the United Kingdom (ASAUK) formed in 1963 "to advance African studies, particularly in the United Kingdom, by providing facilities for the interchange of information and ideas and the co-ordination of activities by and between persons and institutions concerned with the study of Africa." Antony Allott and Roland Oliver led the founding of the group. In recent times the Royal African Society administers the association.

The group organizes conferences and runs the Standing Committee on University Studies in Africa and the Standing Conference on Library Materials on Africa.

Presidents

Distinguished Africanist award
The ASAUK "Distinguished Africanist" award was established in 2001 to pay tribute to those "who have made exceptional contributions to the field of African studies". Its recipients have been:

Publication
  Since 1973. Starting with volume 66 (1994), it is published by SCOLMA (Standing Conference on Library Materials on Africa, UK Libraries and Archives Group on Africa), London. Accordingly, since then the title is African research and documentation. Journal of the Standing Commission on Library Materials on Africa.

References

External links
 Official site www.asauk.net
 OCLC WorldCat.

See also
Africa-Europe Group for Interdisciplinary Studies - AEGIS, European association of research groups focusing on African studies.
African Studies Association - US-based research network focusing on African studies.
Associazione per gli Studi Africani in Italia - ASAI, Italy- based research network focusing on African studies

African studies
Ethnic studies organizations
Learned societies of the United Kingdom
Organizations established in 1963
1963 establishments in the United Kingdom